Katowice-Muchowiec Airport (ICAO code: EPKM) is a general aviation (mainly sport use) airport in the Muchowiec neighbourhood of Katowice, Poland.

However, coal-mining activity damaged the runway and it is no longer used. The parallel 770-metre grass RWY 05/23 is also closed per NOTAM until the end of 2007. This leaves the 655-metre grass RWY 07/25 as the sole working runway.

History
The airport was built in the 1920s, and was used for civil aviation including scheduled passenger traffic, starting in 1926 with service to Warsaw, later also to Cracow, Vienna via Brno. Ground damage due to coal-mining activity eliminated the passenger traffic, and now only the sport use remains with infrequent general aviation arrivals and departures.

On the other hand, because of the long commute from the city centre to the 30 km-distant Katowice International Airport, it has been proposed to the Katowice government in 2005 that a city airport be built at Katowice-Muchowiec Airport, offloading Katowice International for general aviation as well as some smaller scheduled traffic, serving primarily the business community and STOL aircraft.

Modernisation proposals

Katowice (321 thousand inhabitants, 4,5 million in nearby GOP conurbation) intended to transform its inner-city airport (current runway length: 1110 metres, width: 30 metres) into a proper City-Airport (there is limited space for the enlargement of the landing strip to approx. 1500 metres) that would serve this densely populated coal basin. However, only smaller aircraft could use it, and it would serve rather domestic and business traffic.

It was recently decided that building new concrete runway parallel to ul. Lotnisko (Lotnisko Street) with dimensions 850 x 25 metres is the best course of action. Further modernization would require also building new facilities, including a passenger terminal. It is unclear how the proposed improvements are to be squared with the conditions which forced the cessation of passenger traffic in the first place. As of summer 2007, work on fixing the airport has stalled because of a court fight between its resident sport airclubs (aeroclubs) over airport's real estate (nominally owned by the city, but handed over to the airclubs in perpetual lease).

External links
Aeroklub Polski website 
Aeroklub Śląski website 

Airports in Poland
Transport in Katowice
Buildings and structures in Katowice
1920s establishments in Poland